is the third single by Japanese idol group Idoling. It was released both as a normal edition and limited edition CD + DVD, containing special content and rare footage of the group. Track 3 is only available on the normal edition release. Kokuhaku was used as the theme song of the Microsoft Windows Vista "Vista School" campaign. Its highest charted Oricon position was #9. As of early 2009, it is the highest-selling single by Idoling.

Track listings

CD
 
 
  (Bonus track)

DVD
 Special contents

External links
 Pony Canyon - Kokuhaku: Idoling!(Japanese)
 Pony Canyon - Kokuhaku: Idoling!(Japanese)

2008 singles
Idoling!!! songs
2008 songs
Pony Canyon singles
Song articles with missing songwriters